The town of Toodyay, Western Australia, was not always known by that name. Initially Toodyay was located in what is now West Toodyay before repeated flooding caused the town centre to migrate to the area around the Newcastle convict depot creating the town of Newcastle. After approximately 50 years of confusion the name of Newcastle was changed to Toodyay and the original Toodyay became known as West Toodyay.

Toodyay locations
The original townsite of Toodyay was determined in 1836.

The new township, to be known as Newcastle, was gazetted on 1 October 1860.  The name "Newcastle" was derived from the Secretary of State for the Colonies, the Duke of Newcastle.  The township of "Old" Toodyay continued to exist, although it ceased to expand.

In August 1909, the Federal authorities urged the town of Newcastle to change its name.  The towns of Newcastle in New South Wales and Newcastle in Western Australia were being confused. All too often the problem of duplicated place names was causing mail to go astray.

One instance of mail going astray concerned an item discovered by Sir John Forrest.  A beautiful French ormolu clock had been delivered mistakenly to Newcastle, New South Wales, where it had sat unclaimed. Forrest recognised that the clock belonged to William Demasson of Newcastle, Western Australia, and arranged for it to be restored to its rightful owner. This incident is known to have contributed to the call for change.

In February 1910, the Municipal Council held a referendum and, by a slim majority, it was decided to change the name of the town to Toodyay.  On 6 May 1910, it was declared that the town of Newcastle would henceforth be known as Toodyay and the old town of Toodyay would henceforth be known as West Toodyay.

The French Ormolu clock, long held by the Demasson family, was purchased by the National Trust of Western Australia in 1987.  In turn, the clock, together with its documents was offered to the Toodyay Historical Society. On 21 October 2007, the clock was welcomed back to the town of Toodyay.

Meaning of the name 'Toodyay'
In 1929 during Western Australia's centennial year, Victor Riseley published an article in The Sunday Times in response to other publications during the year that had tried to define its origins. Riseley contended that the definition of "beautiful", while the perfect description of the region, was not a descriptive for which the Ballardong people had any use, as their place names were related to the necessities of daily life.

Another possible origin is that toodyay is derived from an account written by James Drummond of a party taking up land grants in the region in 1836. This area was said to be a favourite of the Ballardong people because of the abundance of reed mace, whose thick roots are a good source of starch and mucilage. 

In recent years, other origins for the name have been proposed by anthropologists. Professor Len Collard's Noongar language project provides the meaning as "today it is misty and foggy". This bird is found commonly in the region as well as the Canning region where Babbing grew up. Anthropologists Ken Macintyre and Barb Dobson speculate that Babbing was describing the sound of a bird. Drummond didn't enquire into the meaning of the word, as he did for other words during his account of the 1836 journey. Macintyre and Dobson note that Toodyeep was from the area but that Aboriginal people were named after the place where they were born or raised rather than the place being named after them and therefore dismiss this as a possible origin for the name Toodyay.

By 1842 Drummond in his correspondence was referring to the area as Toodyay while referring to Duidgee Catta as the name of a pool on his estate.

References

Toodyay, Western Australia
West Toodyay
Noongar language
Toodyay
Indigenous toponymy